Patrik Hrošovský (born 22 April 1992) is a Slovak professional football player who plays as a midfielder for Genk and the Slovakia national football team. Previously he was a frequently fielded player and a captain at Viktoria Plzeň becoming the Czech champion with the side on three occasions.

Career

FC Viktoria Plzeň
He made his debut for Viktoria Plzeň against Baník Sokolov on 12 November 2011 in the Czech Cup.

After multiple seasons and becoming a starting XI regular, as well as praise for his performances in 2018–19 UEFA Champions League, it was rumoured that Hrošovský will join one of La Liga's or Premier League's teams - Levante, Getafe and Huddersfield were all named as possible future clubs. During the winter transfer window however, Hrošovský failed to make a transfer. Later during January 2019 transfer window, West Ham was also cited as a contender for his services, however it was dropped as Manuel Pellegrini doesn't favour altering the squad during the season.

Genk

2019–20 season
On 5 June 2019, as Hrošovský was preparing with the national team for a double fixture against Jordan and Azerbaijan, it was reported that he was very close to a transfer to Genk. Verbal agreement was apparently complete, yet an issue arose, as Viktoria was happy to let Hrošovský go later during the summer transfer period, in order to help them qualify to the group stage of the Champions League. Genk was said to oppose this arrangement. Nonetheless, it was said that the transfer was more-or-less a done deal, as Plzeň agreed with Wolverhampton Wanderers on a two year loan, with an option to buy for Christián Herc, who had made a good impression during his loan at DAC Dunajská Streda, and was seen as a replacement for Hrošovský. On the following day, Hrošovský however calmed the rumours, during a press conference prior to the match against Jordan, stating that while negotiations did take place, there is no certainty of a transfer and that he is still a player of Plzeň.

Regardless, this arrangement was confirmed on 8 July 2019, as Hrošovský signed a 4-year contract, with an option for an additional year. He made his Jupiler Pro League debut against multiple-time champions Anderlecht Brussels, in a home fixture on 23 August 2020. He completed the last, roughly, 20 minutes, as a replacement for Jakub Piotrowski. Genk secured a narrow 1:0 win with a second-half goal by Mbwana Samatta.

Hrošovský had recorded five starts for Genk in the UEFA Champions League. He played in both matches against Napoli and Red Bull Salzburg. He played against Liverpool at Anfield only. Genk, however, collected a sole point, for a goal-less tie against Napoli and was knocked out with a score of 5:20.

On top of that, Hrošovský made sole seasonal appearance in the Croky Cup in a Round of 16 loss against Royal Antwerp. Genk were knocked out after a penalty shoot-out. Hrošovský was replaced by Théo Bongonda in the second half.

As an occasional scorer, Hrošovský had to wait until 1 February 2020 for his first goal at Genk. In a league fixture against Charleroi, he had beaten Nicolas Penneteau with a back-heel goal in the 39th minute, utilising a pass from Junya Ito. He was replaced by Kristian Thorstvedt in the second-half. Genk won 1:0.

2020–21 season
Hrošovský missed the first three games of the season, not even making it to the bench with reports that he was no longer considered by the manager Hannes Wolf. He sidelined along with Joseph Paintsil, despite being acquired for considerable sums earlier.

International career
On 19 November 2014, Hrošovský made his debut for the senior Slovakia squad when he started in a friendly against Finland.

Honours

Viktoria Plzeň
Czech First League: 2014–15, 2015–16, 2017–18
Czech Cup runner-up: 2013–14
Czech Supercup: 2011, 2015

Genk
Belgian Cup: 2020–21

Slovakia
King's Cup: 2018

Notes

External links
FC Viktoria Plzeň profile

References

1992 births
Living people
People from Prievidza
Sportspeople from the Trenčín Region
Slovak footballers
Slovakia international footballers
Slovakia youth international footballers
Slovakia under-21 international footballers
Slovak expatriate footballers
Association football midfielders
FC Viktoria Plzeň players
FK Baník Sokolov players
FK Ústí nad Labem players
1. SC Znojmo players
K.R.C. Genk players
Czech National Football League players
Czech First League players
Belgian Pro League players
UEFA Euro 2016 players
UEFA Euro 2020 players
Expatriate footballers in the Czech Republic
Slovak expatriate sportspeople in the Czech Republic
Expatriate footballers in Belgium
Slovak expatriate sportspeople in Belgium